The Mormaer or Earl of Angus was the ruler of the medieval Scottish province of Angus. The title, in the Peerage of Scotland, is held by the Duke of Hamilton, and is used as a courtesy title for the eldest son of the Duke's eldest son.

History

Mormaers
Angus is one of the oldest attested mormaerdoms, with the earliest attested mormaer, Dubacan of Angus, known to have lived in the early 10th century, as recorded in the Chronicle of the Kings of Alba. Angus was, according to the doubtful and legendary text de Situ Albanie, one of the seven original mormaerdoms of the Pictish kingdom of Alba, said to have been occupied by seven brothers, of whom Angus (Oengus) was the eldest. Despite this, the mormaers of Angus are among the most obscure of all. After the death of Mormaer Maol Chaluim, in probably about 1240, the mormaerdom passed through the marriage of his daughter Matilda, to the line of the Norman Gilbert de Umfraville.

Ogilvy Earls
The lands of Clan Ogilvy, in Angus, was ruled by a mormaer; one of the ancient Celtic nobles of Scotland who became the first earls.  The title of Moramer of Angus became Earl of Angus. Gillebride, Earl of Angus, received a Barony from King William the Lion in 1163, and bestowed upon his son, Gilbert, the lands of Wester Powrie, Ogilvy, and Kyneithin. The top left quadrant displays the Ogilvy crest; argent, a lion passant, guardant, Gules, crowned with an imperial crown and collared with an open one, Proper.

Umfraville Earls
Gilbert de Umfraville inherited the Earldom while in his minority after his father's death in 1245. Gilbert fought on the English side during the first war of Scottish independence until his death in 1308. His heir, second son Robert, also fought on the side of the English and surrendered to King Robert de Brus during the Battle of Bannockburn in 1314. He was released by Robert and treated with the Scots for peace with England. He was ultimately disinherited of his titles. Robert's heir Gilbert continued attempting to recover the Earldom and supported Edward Balliol and other disinherited barons and lords in Scotland.

Stewart Earls
John Stewart of Bonkyll, Berwickshire, obtained the title Earl of Angus in 1329 in a new line after the forfeiture of the de Umfraville line, though the latter family continued to use the title in England until 1381. This Stewart line ended with Margaret Stewart, countess of Angus in her own right, and widow of Thomas, Earl of Mar.

Douglas earls
An illicit affair between Margaret Stewart, Countess of Mar and Angus, and her brother in law, William Douglas, 1st Earl of Douglas (married to the sister of her husband), produced George Douglas, 1st Earl of Angus (c. 1380–1403). The Countess secured a charter of her estates for her son, to whom in 1389 the title was granted by King Robert II. He was taken prisoner at Homildon Hill in 1402, and died in captivity in England. Archibald "Bell-the-Cat" (1453–1514) the powerful adversary of James III, was his great-grandson.

William Douglas (1589–1660) 11th Earl of Angus, was created Marquis of Douglas in 1633. He resigned the title of Earl of Angus, having it recreated with the marquessate, so he was the 1st Earl of Angus in the new creation. He outlived his son Archibald Douglas, Earl of Angus (c. 1609–1655), and was succeeded by Archibald's son James Douglas, 2nd Marquess of Douglas (1646–1699). James' son and heir Archibald Douglas was created Duke of Douglas, Marquess of Angus and Abernethy, Viscount of Jedburgh Forest, and Lord Douglas of Bonkill, Prestoun and Robertoun on 10 April 1703. He died without leaving an heir and the titles acquired with the dukedom became extinct. All his other titles devolved to his distant cousin the 7th Duke of Hamilton, whose descendants hold them still.

Mormaers/early Earls of Angus

?
Indrechtach?,  early 10th century
Dubacan, d. 937
 ?
Cuncar,  mid-10th century
 ?
 Gille Brigte, 
 Adam, 

 Gille Críst, ?–1206
 Donnchadh, 1206–1214
 Maol Choluim, 1214–1240
 Matilda (or Maud)
m1. John Comyn, jure uxoris Earl of Angus (d. 1242, without issue)
m2. Gilbert de Umfraville, jure uxoris Earl of Angus
Gilbert de Umfraville, Earl of Angus (Earl: 1246–1307)
Robert de Umfraville, Earl of Angus (Earl: 1307– (forfeit); d. 1325)
 Gilbert de Umfraville (d. 1381)

Earls of Angus, Stewart line (1329)
John Stewart, 1st Earl of Angus (d. 1331)
Thomas Stewart, 2nd Earl of Angus (d. 1361)
Margaret Stewart, Countess of Angus and Mar (d. 1417) (resigned earldom in favour of her son George Douglas in 1389)
Thomas, Earl of Mar suo jure uxoris Earl of Angus (d. 1374)

Earls of Angus, Douglas line (1389)
George Douglas, 1st Earl of Angus (1378–1402)
William Douglas, 2nd Earl of Angus (c. 1398–1437)
James Douglas, 3rd Earl of Angus (b. 1428–1446)
George Douglas, 4th Earl of Angus (b. 1429–1462)
Archibald Douglas, 5th Earl of Angus (1453–1514)
George Douglas, Master of Angus (1469–1513)
Archibald Douglas, 6th Earl of Angus (1490–1557)
David Douglas, 7th Earl of Angus (c. 1515–1558)
Archibald Douglas, 8th Earl of Angus (1556–1588)
William Douglas, 9th Earl of Angus (1533–1591)
William Douglas, 10th Earl of Angus (1552–1611)
William Douglas, 11th Earl of Angus (1590–1660), (created Marquess of Douglas in 1633, when he resigned the earldom, which was regranted with the marquessate)

Marquesses of Douglas (1633)
(After 1633 the Earldom of Angus became a courtesy title used by the eldest son of the Marquess of Douglas)
William Douglas, 1st Marquess of Douglas (1590–1660)
James Douglas, 2nd Marquess of Douglas (1646–1700)
Archibald Douglas, 3rd Marquess of Douglas (1694–1761) (created Duke of Douglas in 1703)

Duke of Douglas (1703)
Archibald Douglas, 1st Duke of Douglas (1694–1761) (created Duke of Douglas in 1703) (the dukedom became extinct on his death, while the Earldom of Angus, Marquessate of Douglas and other subsidiary titles were inherited by James Hamilton, 7th Duke of Hamilton)

For later Earls of Angus and Marquesses of Douglas, see the Duke of Hamilton

Notes

Bibliography

 Roberts, John L., Lost Kingdoms: Celtic Scotland in the Middle Ages, (Edinburgh, 1997), pp. 53–4

External links
Chronicle of the Kings of Alba

People associated with Angus, Scotland
Angus
Angus
Angus
Angus
Angus
Angus
Feudalism in Scotland